Elections were held in North Carolina on Tuesday, November 2, 2010. Primary elections took place on May 4, 2010.

Federal

United States Senate 

Incumbent Republican Richard Burr won re-election against a crowded field.

United States House 

All 13 seats in the United States House of Representatives were up for election in 2010.  All thirteen incumbents sought re-election.

State
Statewide offices in North Carolina, including Governor, Lieutenant Governor, Secretary of State, Attorney General, Treasurer, and Auditor, were not up for election in 2010.

State Senate
All 50 seats in the North Carolina Senate were up for election in 2010.

State House of Representatives
All 120 seats in the North Carolina House of Representatives were up for election in 2010.

Judicial positions

At least one North Carolina Supreme Court seat and four North Carolina Court of Appeals seats were up for election in 2010.  Vacancies on either court that occurred before the election may increased the number of seats on the ballot.

Ballot measures
At least one statewide ballot measure was on the November 2 ballot:
 Prohibit convicted felons from running for sheriff in the state

Local
Many elections for county offices were also held on November 2, 2010.

External links
North Carolina Secretary of State - Elections
Campaign finance data at OpenSecrets
Campaign finance data at the National Institute for Money in State Politics
Campaign 2010 from The Charlotte Observer
Election 2010 at the Winston-Salem Journal

 
North Carolina